Tūpare is a former family home in the Arts & Crafts  / Tudor style surrounded by a 3.6 ha park / garden in New Plymouth, New Zealand  that is now owned and operated by the Taranaki Regional Council as a public park and event venue. It is located above the Waiwhakaiho River.

The garden was one of the four (public) gardens that formed a core of the original garden festival of New Plymouth. It has also been named as one of Top 50 New Zealand Gardens by a garden guide book.

References

External links 
Tūpare Official website

New Plymouth
Gardens in New Zealand